Douglas Russell Feaver (1914–1997) was the Bishop of Peterborough in the Church of England from 1972 to 1984.

Fever was educated at Bristol Grammar School and  Keble College, Oxford; and ordained in 1938. He was a curate at St Alban's Abbey then  a wartime chaplain in the RAFVR. He later became Sub-Dean of the abbey, Rural Dean of Nottingham (and Vicar of St Mary's) before becoming Peterborough's Bishop.

References

External links
 St Mary's, Nottingham

1914 births
1997 deaths
People educated at Bristol Grammar School
Royal Air Force Volunteer Reserve personnel of World War II
Royal Air Force chaplains
Vicars of St Mary's Church, Nottingham
Bishops of Peterborough
Alumni of Keble College, Oxford
20th-century Church of England bishops